Fermín IV Caballero Elizondo (born December 22 1974) is a Mexican rapper and Evangelical pastor, better known as a former part of the Mexican hip hop group Control Machete.

As part of Control Machete, he obtained in 2000 a Latin Grammy Award nomination for "Sí señor" as "Best Rock Song", a platinum RIAA certification for the album "Mucho Barato", and later as a solo artist, he has been a winner twice in the Arpa Awards of 2003 and 2018 as "Best Urban Album".

Background 
Fermín IV was born in Monterrey, Nuevo León and has become a benchmark of Mexican hip hop. He is the primary voice of Control Machete and one of the main characters of the movement of the 90s known as "Avanzada regia".

In the early 1990s he was in a local rock band called Prófuga de Metate. He met Toy Selectah (a.k.a. DJ Toy) who was experimenting the drum machine and samples, which are typically used in hip hop, and became interested in making rap music.  which he record in song called "Siempre Peligroso" on Los grandes éxitos en español, which become a hit on Latin America & certain countries right away.

Control Machete 
In 1996, Toy Selectah formed Control Machete having Fermín IV and Patricio Elizalde together in the group. Being part of this trio, in 1997 they released their first album called Mucho Barato, where "Comprendes Mendes" was very well received. Then came "Artillería Pesada Presenta", an album that included the single "Sí Señor", a track nominated for "Best Rock Song" at the 2000 Latin Grammy Awards.

After his stage with Control Machete, he shared the stage with artists such as U2, Eminem and David Bowie, his extensive tours of America and Europe. Fermín left the group in 2000, his last participation being in the song "De Perros Amores", the soundtrack of the film nominated for the Oscar Awards, Amores perros, to continue his solo career with his album "Boomerang", which contains the theme "004", used in the movie XXx) and won an Arpa Award for "Best Art Design" and "Best Rock or Alternative Album".

Ministry 
In 2001, he became a Christian and collaborated on some songs of the musical albums of an evangelical church, Semilla de Mostaza, Semilla de Mostaza Presenta, in 2001; Gracias in 2003, the two studio albums; and Concierto En Vivo Desde Monterrey in 2003.  He became pastor of the church in 2005.  "Gracias" in 2003, both studio albums and "Concierto en Vivo Desde Monterrey" in 2003, a live album.

Later, he would release several productions, the first would be a live album entitled "Fermín IV En Vivo" in 2004, astudio album called "Los que Trastornan al mundo" in 2005 and a various artist album titled "Hip Hop por la vida" and a compilation album called "Dúos Con", both in 2008.

After several years of silence in music, Fermin returned in 2014 with an EP called "Y Mi Vida Comenzó", where the song "No podría estar mejor" was the single from that 4-song album.

In 2017, he signed with the Sony Music label.  In August 2017, Fermín IV released his EP entitled "Odio / Amor", with the single "Fácil", which marked his return to the recording studios. With this album, he was once again the winner of an recognition at the Arpa Awards.

In 2018, Fermin was releasing singles with great collaborations "Deseos", "Valentía" with Akil Ammar, being songs for his album "IV", which would be later promoted as "Laberinto", and finally released under the name "Decisiones".

Discography

As Control Machete 
 Mucho Barato... (1996) [Studio album]
 Artillería Pesada Presenta (1999) [Studio album]
 Solo Para Fanáticos (2002) [Compilation album]

As soloist 
 Boomerang (2002) [Studio album]
Fermín IV En Vivo (2004) [Live album]
 Los Que Trastornan al Mundo (2005) [Studio album]
Fermin IV Presenta: Están por Alcanzarte / Hip Hop por la Vida (2008) [Various Artist album]
Dúos Con (2008) [Compilation album]
 Y Mi Vida Comenzó (2014) [EP album]
Odio/Amor (2017) [EP album] 
 Decisiones (2019) [Studio album]
 Ya Puedes Sonreír (2022) [EP]

References 

Mexican male rappers
People from Monterrey
People from Nuevo León
1974 births
Living people
Mexican Christians
Evangelical pastors